Titonka is a city in Kossuth County, Iowa, United States. The population was 511 at the time of the 2020 census.

History
Titonka got its start in the year 1898, following construction of the Burlington, Cedar Rapids and Northern Railway through that territory. Titonka is a Sioux name meaning "big black (buffalo)".

Titonka was incorporated on February 1, 1898.

Geography
Titonka is located at  (43.236534, -94.041839).

Demographics

2010 census
As of the census of 2010, there were 476 people, 223 households, and 114 families living in the city. The racial makeup of the city was 98.7% White, 0.2% Native American, 0.4% Pacific Islander, and 0.6% from two or more races. Hispanic or Latino of any race were 1.5% of the population.

There were 223 households, of which 20.6% had children under the age of 18 living with them, 43.0% were married couples living together, 7.2% had a female householder with no husband present, 0.9% had a male householder with no wife present, and 48.9% were non-families. 47.5% of all households were made up of individuals, and 26% had someone living alone who was 65 years of age or older. The average household size was 1.99 and the average family size was 2.85.

The median age in the city was 52.4 years. 20.4% of residents were under the age of 18; 4.8% were between the ages of 18 and 24; 16% were from 25 to 44; 24.7% were from 45 to 64; and 34% were 65 years of age or older. The gender makeup of the city was 46.0% male and 54.0% female.

2000 census
As of the census of 2000, there were 584 people, 250 households, and 148 families living in the city. The racial makeup of the city was 99.32% White, 0.17% Asian, and 0.51% from two or more races. Hispanic or Latino of any race were 0.51% of the population.

There were 250 households, out of which 24.4% had children under the age of 18 living with them, 52.4% were married couples living together, 5.6% had a female householder with no husband present, and 40.4% were non-families. 38.4% of all households were made up of individuals, and 25.2% had someone living alone who was 65 years of age or older. The average household size was 2.21 and the average family size was 2.94.

In the city the population was spread out, with 21.4% under the age of 18, 6.3% from 18 to 24, 20.9% from 25 to 44, 16.8% from 45 to 64, and 34.6% who were 65 years of age or older. The median age was 46 years. For every 100 females, there were 81.9 males. For every 100 females age 18 and over, there were 75.2 males.

The median income for a household in the city was $35,147, and the median income for a family was $44,125. Males had a median income of $26,500 versus $19,750 for females. The per capita income for the city was $16,594. About 3.9% of families and 5.8% of the population were below the poverty line, including 9.9% of those under age 18 and 6.1% of those age 65 or over.

Education
The community is served by the Algona Community School District. It operates Algona High School.

It was a part of the Titonka Consolidated School District until July 1, 2014, when it consolidated into the Algona district. The Algona district, which took control of the Titonka school building, was scheduled to sell it to the Titonka city government on January 12, 2015.

References

External links
City website
City-Data.com
ePodunk:Profile for Titonka, Iowa, IA

Cities in Kossuth County, Iowa
Cities in Iowa
1898 establishments in Iowa
Populated places established in 1898